Simeon ben Helbo Kara was a French rabbi who lived in Mans in the 11th century; brother of Menahem ben Helbo and father of Joseph Ḳara.  Isaac de Lattes, in his Ḳiryat Sefer, counts Ḳara among the prominent French rabbis, although no work of his has survived. J.L. Rapoport identified him with the compiler of the Yalḳuṭ Shim'oni, on account of the similarity of some Midrashic quotations in this work with citations in Rashi's Bible commentary. Abraham Epstein has, however, shown that in the manuscripts the name "Ḳara" does not occur, and in place of "Simeon" the reading "Simson" at times is found.

The surname Ḳara is usually taken to be a professional name, meaning 'reader' or 'interpreter of the Bible'. Adolf Jellinek the Austrian rabbi and historian points out, however, that Ḳara, as contrasted with Derash, means the 'representative of the Peshaṭ.

References

Sources

Jewish Encyclopedia bibliography

 Zunz, Leopold, Gottesdienstliche Vorträge p. 313
 Zunz, Zur Geschichte und Literatur p. 61
 J.L. Rapoport. Kerem Ḥemed, vii. 4 et seq.
 Kirchheim, in Literaturblatt des Orients iv. 253
 A. Geiger, Niṭ'e Na'amanim, German part, p. 8
 Geiger, in Zeitschrift der Deutschen Morgenländischen Gesellschaft xxviii. 300
 I.H. Weiss, in Bet Talmud, ii. 35
 Brüll's Jahrbücher für Jüdische Geschichte und Litteratur viii. 113
 Abraham Epstein, in Ha-Ḥoḳer, i. 85 et seq. 
 Chaim Azulai, Shem ha-Gedolim, ed. Benjacob, i.36
 David Conforte, Dore ha-Dorot (see index in Cassel ed.)
 Frumkin, Eben Shemuel, pp. 67 et seq., 125 et seq., Vilna, 1874
 Michael, Or ha-Ḥayyim (Heimann Joseph Michael), No. 612
 Luncz, in Jerusalem, ii.23-27
 Responsa of Yom-Tov Zahalon, No. 160

Year of birth missing
Year of death missing
French Orthodox rabbis
11th-century French rabbis